The following is a list of notable Old Greshamians, former pupils of Gresham's School, an independent coeducational boarding school in Holt, Norfolk, England.

Public life

James Allan – British High Commissioner in Mauritius and ambassador to Mozambique
Duncan Baker (born 1979)  – Conservative Member of Parliament.
Sir Eric Berthoud – British ambassador to Denmark and Poland
Robert Brightiffe (c. 1666–1749) barrister and Member of Parliament
Derek Bryan – Diplomat, sinologist, writer
Erskine Childers – fourth President of Ireland
Sir Stewart Crawford – diplomat
Kenelm Hubert Digby (1912–2001), proposer of the notorious 1933 "King and Country" debate and later Attorney General and judge in Sarawak
Bernard Floud – Labour politician
Sir Cecil Graves – Director-General of the BBC
Thomas George Greenwell – National Conservative member of parliament
Sir Christopher Heydon – 16th century member of parliament
Paul Howell – Conservative Member of the European Parliament  for Norfolk
Robert Lymbery - Common Serjeant of London
Donald Maclean – diplomat and spy
11th Earl of Northesk – parliamentarian
Terence O'Brien – British ambassador to Nepal, Burma and Indonesia
John Playfair Price – diplomat, a President of the Oxford Union
Laurance Reed – Conservative politician
Lord Reith – first Director-General of the BBC – politician
Wilfrid Roberts – Liberal politician
Christian Schiller – HM Inspector of Schools
11th Lord Strabolgi – Labour politician
Dr Thomas Stuttaford – Conservative politician and journalist
C. G. H. Simon (1914–2002), Income Tax General Commissioner
Lord Simon of Glaisdale – Conservative politician and law lord
Lord Simon of Wythenshawe – socialist and journalist
Sir Edward Blanshard Stamp – Lord Justice of Appeal
Sir William Royden Stuttaford – President of the National Union of Conservative and Unionist Associations
Sir Gerald Thesiger – High Court Judge
Sir John Tusa – Director of BBC World Service
Lord Wilson of High Wray – governor of the BBC and Lord Lieutenant of Westmorland and of Cumbria
Sir Percy Wyn-Harris – governor of The Gambia

Armed forces

General Sir Terence Airey – soldier, GOC Hong Kong
Captain Joe Baker-Cresswell – Royal Navy officer, aide-de-camp to George VI
Peter Beck – soldier and schoolmaster 
General Sir Robert Bray – Deputy Supreme Allied Commander Europe
Sir Stephen Bull, 2nd Baronet – killed on active service in Java, 1942
Donald Cunnell – First World War fighter pilot
Air Vice-Marshal Sir William Cushion – Royal Air Force officer and British Overseas Airways Corporation executive
Major-General Guy Gregson – soldier
Sir Christopher Heydon – took part in the capture of Cádiz, 1596
General Sir William Holmes – Second World War general
Henry Howard – Second World War commander of the Oxfordshire and Buckinghamshire Light Infantry
Brigadier Julian Jefferson, British Army officer
Major-General John Lethbridge – soldier
Rear Admiral Martin Lucey (1920–1992), Flag Officer, Scotland and Northern Ireland and Admiral President of the Royal Naval College, Greenwich
Major-General Patrick Marriott – Commandant of the Royal Military Academy Sandhurst 2009–2012
Rear-Admiral Brian Perowne – Chief of Fleet Support, Royal Navy
Brigadier Sir Philip Toosey – Bridge on the River Kwai commander
Tom Wintringham – soldier, military historian, journalist, poet, communist
Major-General A. E. Younger – soldier
Major General Alastair Duncan – soldier

Church

 John Astley – 18th century Norfolk pluralist
Edwin Boston – founder of the Cadeby Light Railway, "the Fat Clergyman" in the books of the Rev. W. Awdry
John Bradburne – Franciscan
John Burrell (1762–1825), clergyman and entomologist
John Daly – bishop of The Gambia, Accra, Korea and Taejon
Colin Forrester-Paton – missionary and Chaplain to H.M. The Queen in Scotland
Most Rev. David Hand – Archbishop of Papua New Guinea
Dr John Johnson (1769–1833)  – clergyman and editor
Peter Lee – bishop of the diocese of Christ the King, Johannesburg
William Lubbock – 18th century divine, Fellow of Caius College, Cambridge
Charles Abdy Marcon – Master of Marcon's Hall, Oxford, 1891 to 1918
John Moorman – Bishop of Ripon
Thomas Pyle – 18th century clergyman and writer
Herbert Reeve – Church of England missionary and clergyman in New Zealand
Robin Woods – Dean of Windsor and Bishop of Worcester

Medicine
Richard Battle – plastic surgeon
Roger Carpenter – neurophysiologist
Major-General Joseph Crowdy – Commandant of the Royal Army Medical Corps
Michael Fordham – psychiatrist
Douglas Gairdner, paediatrician
Thomas Girdlestone – physician and writer
John Grange – immunologist
William Henry Kelson, physician, president of the Hunterian Society
Dermod MacCarthy – paediatrician 
William Rushton FRS – physiologist
Thomas Stuttaford – doctor and politician
Hugh Christian Watkins – cardiologist
Anthony Yates – rheumatologist

Nobel Prize-winner
Sir Alan Lloyd Hodgkin – Nobel Prize for Medicine, President of the Royal Society, Master of Trinity College, Cambridge

Academics

Arts

Norman Cohn – historian
Oliver Elton – literary critic, translator
Boris Ford – literary critic, editor
Alfred Gissing – biographer
John Davy Hayward – editor and critic
Andrew Hurrell - Professor of International Relations, Oxford University
Michael Kitson – art historian
James Klugmann – Communist historian
2nd Baron Lindsay of Birker – political scientist
W. Wesley Pue – academic lawyer
Sir James Maude Richards – architectural historian
E. Clive Rouse –  archaeologist
John Saltmarsh – historian
Brian Simon – educational historian
Peter J N Sinclair – economist

Sciences

L. E. Baynes – aeronautical engineer
Arnold Beck – electrical engineer, Professor of Engineering at Cambridge 
David Bensusan-Butt – economist
Derek Bryan – sinologist
Anthony Bull – transport engineer
Sir Henry Clay, 6th Baronet – engineer
Sir Christopher Cockerell – inventor of the hovercraft
Nicholas Day - statistician and epidemiologist
C. H. Gimingham – botanist
Dr Hildebrand Hervey FRS – marine biologist
Sir John Hammond – agricultural research scientist
 Ian Hepburn, botanist and schoolteacher
Harry Hodson – economist
G. Evelyn Hutchinson – zoologist
Bryan Keith-Lucas – political scientist
David Keith-Lucas – aeronautical engineer
David Lack – evolutionary biologist
The Honourable David Layton – economist and industrial relations specialist
Dr Colin Leakey – botanist
Maurice Lister – chemist
Jonathan Partington – mathematician
Frank Perkins – engineer
Christopher Strachey – computer scientist
Sir Owen Wansbrough-Jones – chemist, weapons research scientist
Sir Martin Wood – engineer

Henry Snaith - FRS Professor of Physics, Oxford University
James Durrant - FRS Professor of Photochemistry, Imperial College

Writers

Poets
W. H. Auden – poet
John Henry Colls, 18th century poet
Andrew Jefford – poet and wine writer
Michael Laskey – poet
John Pudney – poet and novelist
Sir Stephen Spender – poet

Novelists
John Lanchester – novelist
Sabin Willett – novelist

Journalists
Matt Arnold  – journalist and television presenter
Bruce Belfrage - BBC Radio newsreader and actor
Cedric Belfrage – journalist and author 
Mark Brayne – BBC foreign correspondent and psychotherapist
Rupert Hamer – journalist killed in Afghanistan
Alastair Hetherington – journalist, editor of The Guardian
Paddy O'Connell – journalist and main presenter of BBC Radio 4's Broadcasting House
Edmund Rogers – journalist
Philip Pembroke Stephens – journalist
Sir John Tusa – BBC journalist

Other

Maurice Ash – environmentalist writer
Robert Eagle (filmmaker) – film and television writer and director
Sir Christopher Heydon – 17th century writer on astrology
Lady Flora McDonnell – children's author
Pat Simon – wine writer and Master of Wine
Kenneth Taylor – television scriptwriter
William Osborne — screenwriter

Music

Richard Austin – conductor
Benjamin Britten, Lord Britten of Aldeburgh – composer
Sir Lennox Berkeley – composer
Richard Hand – classical guitarist
Christopher J. Monckton – organist and conductor
Heathcote Dicken Statham – composer and organist
George Stiles – composer
Roderick Watkins – composer

Artists

Michael Cummings – cartoonist
Richard Chopping – book cover illustrator, painter and novelist 
William Lionel Clause, landscape artist
Sir Philip Dowson – architect and president of the Royal Academy
Edward Frank Gillett – sporting artist
Robert Medley RA – artist
Ben Nicholson, OM – artist
Christopher Nicholson – architect
Christopher Perkins – artist
Humphrey Spender – photographer
Tony Tuckson – artist
Charles Mayes Wigg – artist

Sport

Giles Baring – cricketer
Glyn Barnett – rifleman, Commonwealth Games gold medallist 2006
Tom Bourdillon – mountaineer
Gawain Briars – British No. 1 squash player
11th Earl of Northesk – Olympic medallist (skeleton, 1928)
Andrew Corran – cricketer
Peter Croft – cricketer and Olympic field hockey player
Matthew Dickinson – mountaineer and adventurer
Dennis Eagan – field hockey player, bronze medallist in the 1952 Summer Olympics
Natasha Firman – Formula Woman racing driver
Ralph Firman – Formula One racing driver
Julian Jefferson – cricketer
Richard Leman – hockey player and Olympic gold medallist
Peter Lloyd – mountaineer
 Richard Millman - Squash national champion and coach
Andy Mulligan – captain of Ireland and the British and Irish Lions Rugby XV
Tom Percival (1943–1984) – powerboat racer 
Ben Pienaar – rugby union player and Junior National Champion at judo
Harry Simmons – rugby footballer
Pat Symonds – Formula One racing
Nick Youngs – England rugby union footballer
Ben Youngs – England Rugby Team, British Lion and member of Leicester Tigers and Heineken Cup medal winner
Tom Youngs – England Rugby Team, British Lion 
Sir Percy Wyn-Harris – mountaineer

Performing arts

Kat Alano – model, actress
Michael Aldridge – actor
Bruce Belfrage – actor, news reader, politician
Peter Brook – theatre director
Olivia Colman (Sarah Colman) – actress
Michael Culver – actor
Henry Daniell – actor
Nigel Dick – music video and film director
Stephen Frears – film director
Sienna Guillory – actress
Geoffrey Gwyther – singer, actor, and song-writer 
Julian Jarrold – television and film director
Ben Mansfield – actor
Robert Mawdesley – actor
Bill Mason – documentary film maker
Ed Nell – radio presenter
Paddy O'Connell – television presenter
Joshua "JP" Patterson – cast member of Made in Chelsea
Miranda Raison – actress
Sebastian Shaw – actor
Patrick Waddington – actor
Peter Whitbread – actor and scriptwriter

Business

Sir Harold Atcherley – Royal Dutch Shell executive; Chairman of Tyzack & Partners
Randal McDonnell, 10th Earl of Antrim – Chairman of Sarasin and Partners LLP 
Sir James Dyson – inventor and entrepreneur
 Anthony Habgood – Chairman of Court, Bank of England. Chairman of Reed Elsevier and past chairman Whitbread 
Sir Robin Ibbs – banker
Charles Kearley – property developer and art collector
Sir Christopher Howes – chief executive of the Crown Estate
Sir William Stuttaford – stockbroker and business man
John L. Marden – Chairman of Wheelock and Marden Co. Ltd

Other

Robert Aagaard – furniture maker and founder of the youth movement Cathedral Camps
Theodore Acland – headmaster of Norwich School
Sir John Agnew, 6th Baronet – landowner, festivals organizer
Sir George Anthony Agnew, 7th Baronet – landowner 
Jeremy Bamber – convicted murderer
Bill Bell – chief legal adviser to Lloyds Bank 
Thomas Blanco White QC, British patent lawyer
John Bradbury, 3rd Baron Bradbury 
Martin Burgess FSA – master clockmaker
Rupert Byron, 11th Baron Byron
Trevor Roberts, 2nd Baron Clwyd
Edward Charles Fitzroy – direct descendant of Charles II, heir to the Barony of Southampton
Anthony Coke, 6th Earl of Leicester
Sir Weldon Dalrymple-Champneys CB DM FRCP
David W. Doyle – CIA officer and author
James Halman (died 1702), Master of Gonville and Caius College, Cambridge
George Hunt Holley
Christopher Newbury – Council of Europe
John Carnegie, 12th Earl of Northesk
Ian Proctor – yacht designer
William Joseph Spratling, Grand Sword Bearer of England
8th Baron Suffield

In fiction
Among fictional OGs, John Mortimer's television barrister Rumpole sent his son Nick to the school during the 1970s.

Notable Gresham's masters

Logie Bruce Lockhart – Scotland rugby footballer, headmaster
Warin Foster Bushell – later headmaster of Michaelhouse and Birkenhead School and president of the Mathematical Association
Antony R. Clark – headmaster since 2002, first-class cricketer
C. V. Durell – writer of mathematics textbooks
Graeme Fife – writer – playwright and broadcaster
Walter Greatorex – composer
Dalziel Llewellyn Hammick – research chemist
John Holmes – writer of textbooks on grammar, rhetoric and astronomy
George Howson – headmaster, 1900-1919
Charles W. Lloyd – Master of Dulwich College
Frank McEachran – author
Geoffrey Shaw – organist and composer
Patrick Thompson – Conservative Member of Parliament
Hugh Wright – Headmaster 1985–1991, later Chairman of the Headmasters' Conference
Graeme Fife – Writer and broadcaster
Professor Richard D'Aeth (later Master of Hughes Hall, Cambridge)

Notable governors of the school
A. C. Benson
Field Marshal Sir Evelyn Wood
Sir Richard Carew Pole, 13th Baronet
Pauline Perry, Baroness Perry of Southwark
Sir Angus Stirling
David Cairns, 5th Earl Cairns
Anthony Duckworth-Chad
Anne, Princess Royal
James Dyson

See also

Gresham's School
List of Masters of Gresham's School

References

 
Gresham's School
Gresham
Old Gresham